Plagiomimicus is a genus of moths of the family Noctuidae. The genus was erected by Augustus Radcliffe Grote in 1873.

Species
 Plagiomimicus astigmatosum (Dyar, 1921)
 Plagiomimicus aureolum (H. Edwards, 1882)
 Plagiomimicus biundulalis (Zeller, 1872)
 Plagiomimicus caesium (Blanchard & Knudson, 1984)
 Plagiomimicus curiosum (Neumoegen, 1884)
 Plagiomimicus dimidiata (Grote, 1877)
 Plagiomimicus expallidus Grote, 1883
 Plagiomimicus hachita (Barnes, 1904)
 Plagiomimicus heitzmani Poole, 1995
 Plagiomimicus hilli (Barnes & Benjamin, 1923)
 Plagiomimicus hutsoni (J.B. Smith, 1907)
 Plagiomimicus kathyae Adams, 2009
 Plagiomimicus manti (Barnes, 1904)
 Plagiomimicus mimica Poole, 1995 
 Plagiomimicus navia (Harvey, 1875) (alternative spelling Plagiomimicus navium)
 Plagiomimicus ochoa (Barnes, 1904)
 Plagiomimicus olivalis (Barnes & McDunnough, 1916)
 Plagiomimicus olvello (Barnes, 1907)
 Plagiomimicus pityochromus Grote, 1873
 Plagiomimicus pyralina (Schaus, 1904)
 Plagiomimicus spumosum (Grote, 1874) (syn: Plagiomimicus mavina (Barnes & McDunnough, 1910))
 Plagiomimicus sexseriata (Grote, 1881)
 Plagiomimicus tepperi (Morrison, 1875)
 Plagiomimicus triplagiatus J.B. Smith, 1890
 Plagiomimicus unicum (Barnes & Benjamin, 1926)

References

Amphipyrinae